Push is a studio album by German jazz pianist and composer Jacky Terrasson. Concord Jazz released the album on April 27, 2010. This is his debut release for Concord and eleventh overall. Push also marks his vocal debut.

Reception
Phil Johnson of The Independent wrote, "You can read the jazz recession into Terrasson's slight slip down the rankings in recent years, and the trying-too-hard-to-please-ness of this partial recovery with an augmented trio... There's no doubting his talent, but you can't please everyone, especially in jazz." John Fordham of The Guardian stated, "this set feels warmer, more musical and more mindful of its materials than previous outings, as well as emitting bursts of headlong energy that make you whoop." Raul D'Gama Rose of All About Jazz mentioned, "Push, then, is absolutely classic Terrasson. It is full of double entendre, unbridled ideation and luminosity. Like Monk, his muse, Terrasson's solos are abstruse. This is because his purported approach is never linear, but is instead curved—and if he can get away with it, inside out. He attacks melodies askance, sometimes taking cues for his solo excursions from the third or fourth line in a verse." Added Nate Chinen of The New York Times, "His brightly energetic, pristinely articulated pianism is the album’s crux."

Track listing

Personnel
Jacky Terrasson – piano, keyboards, vocals (tracks: 8 11)
Ben Williams – acoustic bass, electric bass
Jamire Williams – drums 
Matthew Stevens – guitar (tracks: 8)
Gregoire Maret – harmonica (tracks: 3 8)
Cyro Baptista – percussion (tracks: 8 10 11)
Jacques Schwarz-Bart – tenor saxophone (tracks: 6)

Charts

References

2010 albums
Concord Records albums
Jacky Terrasson albums